Causey Reservoir is a reservoir located  northeast of Ogden, Utah, United States just off Utah State Route 39.

Geography

Causey is a  surface area reservoir on the South Fork of the Ogden River.

Causey is located in steep, forested valley terrain and extends into three canyons.

The Weber Basin Water Conservancy District operates the reservoir.

History
Causey Dam was constructed between 1962 and 1966 by the Bureau of Reclamation to provide water to the northern Wasatch front area of Utah. It is an earthfill dam.

Drownings and Deaths
On March 20, 2020, a 19-year-old male drowned. The Weber County Sheriff's office said the call came in at 2:45 a.m. The body was recovered within an hour.

On August 14, 2015, a group of individuals was cliff jumping at the reservoir. At one point, a person jumped in and didn't surface. The body of the cliff diver was found the next day at approximately 11 a.m.

On September 1, 2007, an 18-year-old exchange student drowned while swimming across a narrow part of the reservoir. The teen's body was found the next day in 121 feet of water.

In August 1989 an airman from Hill Air Force Base drowned while swimming to a popular cliff jumping location.

In July 1988, a 17-year-old boy drowned while trying to swim to an area to cliff jump. It took over a year for authorities to recover the body.

Activities
Activities at Causey Reservoir include boating and fishing. There are no dedicated boat-launch facilities, and only wake-less speeds are allowed. Fishing includes Kokanee Salmon and several trout varieties, including rainbow, cutthroat, and brown.  Causey is also one of the few places in Utah where spearfishing is allowed. (Note: Always check Utah Fishing regulations because they change from year to year)

Swimming and cliff jumping are also popular.

Camping and picnic sites are available near Memorial Park and along the Ogden River.

Camp Kiesel, a Boy Scout camp, is located on the northern arm of the reservoir.

See also
 List of dams and reservoirs in Utah

References

External links

 Causey Reservoir fishing

Reservoirs in Utah
Lakes of Weber County, Utah
Buildings and structures in Weber County, Utah
Dams in Utah
United States Bureau of Reclamation dams
Dams completed in 1966